Blues Traveler, the eponymous debut album from Blues Traveler, was released on A&M Records in 1990. The album features "jam structures on basic blues riffs" focused around the harmonica playing of band leader John Popper, which writer William Ruhlmann said gave the band a more focused sound than that of the Grateful Dead.

Track listing
 "But Anyway" (Chan Kinchla, John Popper) – 4:10
 "Gina" (Kinchla, Popper) – 4:03
 "Mulling It Over" (Kinchla, Popper) – 3:43
 "100 Years" (Popper) – 3:43
 "Dropping Some NYC" (Kinchla, Popper, Bobby Sheehan) – 3:19
 "Crystal Flame" (Kinchla, Popper) – 9:39
 "Slow Change" (Kinchla, Popper) – 4:54
 "Warmer Days" (Popper) – 4:55
 "Gotta Get Mean" (Brendan Hill, Kinchla, Popper) – 3:49
 "Alone" (Popper) – 7:33
 "Sweet Talking Hippie" (Hill, Kinchla, Popper, Sheehan) – 6:22

Personnel
Blues Traveler
John Popper – lead vocals, harmonica, 12-string acoustic guitar
Chan Kinchla – guitar
Bobby Sheehan – bass
Brendan Hill – drums, percussion
Additional personnel
Chris Barron, Justin Niebank, Kevin Traynor – backing vocals on "Dropping Some NYC"
Joan Osborne – backing vocals on "100 Years" and "Warmer Days"
Howie Wyeth – piano on "Warmer Days"
Arnie Lawrence – soprano saxophone on "100 Years"

Certifications

References

Blues Traveler albums
1990 debut albums
A&M Records albums